Pentagon City may refer to:
 Pentagon City, Arlington, Virginia, a neighborhood in Arlington County, Virginia
 Pentagon City (WMATA station), a Washington Metro station serving the Pentagon City neighborhood
 The Fashion Centre at Pentagon City, aka "Pentagon City Mall", a large shopping mall adjacent to the Pentagon City Metro station